Fred Williams (born April 15, 1988) is an American football wide receiver who is a free agent He played college football at St. Cloud State University and attended South Division High School in Milwaukee, Wisconsin. He played for the San Jose Sabercats of the Arena Football League from 2011 to 2013. He also was on the Kansas City Chiefs' practice squad off and on from 2013 to 2015.

Professional career
Williams was rated the 234th best wide receiver in the 2011 NFL Draft by NFLDraftScout.com.

San Jose Sabercats
Williams was signed by the San Jose Sabercats on November 17, 2011. He played for the Sabercats during the 2012 and 2013 Arena Football League seasons.

Kansas City Chiefs
Williams signed with the Kansas City Chiefs on December 18, 2013. He was released by the Chiefs on August 30, 2014. He was signed to the Chiefs' practice squad on September 2, 2014. Williams was released by the Chiefs on September 5, 2015 and signed to the team's practice squad on September 6, 2015. He was released by the Chiefs on October 1, 2015 and signed to the team's practice squad on October 19, 2015. He was released by the Chiefs on October 24 and signed to the practice squad on October 28, 2015. On January 18, 2016, the Chiefs signed Williams to a future/reserve contract. Williams was released by the Chiefs on May 4, 2016.

Los Angeles KISS
On July 7, 2016, Williams was assigned to the Los Angeles KISS.

Washington Valor
On October 14, 2016, Williams was selected by the Washington Valor during the dispersal draft. On February 20, 2017, he was placed on league suspension.

Arizona Rattlers
On February 9, 2017, Williams signed with the Arizona Rattlers of the Indoor Football League (IFL).

References

External links
Just Sports Stats
Kansas City Chiefs profile

Living people
1988 births
American football wide receivers
African-American players of American football
St. Cloud State Huskies football players
San Jose SaberCats players
Kansas City Chiefs players
Los Angeles Kiss players
Washington Valor players
Arizona Rattlers players
Players of American football from Milwaukee
South Division High School alumni